Lugouqiao Subdistrict may refer to the following places in China:

 Liuliqiao Subdistrict, a subdistrict of Fengtai District, Beijing, known as Lugouqiao Subdistrict prior to July 11, 2021
 Lugouqiao, Beijing, a subdistrict of Fengtai District, Beijing, known as Lugouqiao Township (Area) prior to July 11, 2021